Kenneth Warren Wright (September 4, 1946 – January 21, 2017) was a professional baseball pitcher. He played all or part of five seasons in Major League Baseball from 1970 to 1974 for the Kansas City Royals and New York Yankees.

After attending Escambia High School he was signed by the Boston Red Sox as an amateur free agent in 1964, Wright was selected from Boston in the rule 5 draft by the Kansas City Royals. He made his Major League Baseball debut with the Royals on April 10, 1970, and appeared in his final game on April 28, 1974, with the New York Yankees.

Wright died January 21, 2017.

References

1946 births
2017 deaths
Major League Baseball pitchers
Kansas City Royals players
New York Yankees players
Wellsville Red Sox players
Winston-Salem Red Sox players
Pittsfield Red Sox players
Omaha Royals players
Sacramento Solons players
Toledo Mud Hens players
Baseball players from Florida
Sportspeople from Pensacola, Florida